Joseph Felix Casey  (August 15, 1887 – June 2, 1966) was a professional baseball player from 1908 to 1924. He played four seasons in Major League Baseball for the Detroit Tigers from 1909 to 1911 and the Washington Senators in 1918.  He went to Boston College.

Sources

Major League Baseball catchers
Detroit Tigers players
Washington Senators (1901–1960) players
Hartford Senators players
Little Rock Travelers players
Indianapolis Indians players
St. Paul Saints (AA) players
Lewiston Cupids players
Providence Grays (minor league) players
Rochester Hustlers players
Buffalo Bisons (minor league) players
Vernon Tigers players
Baltimore Orioles (IL) players
Syracuse Stars (minor league baseball) players
Portsmouth Truckers players
San Antonio Bears players
Greenville Spinners players
Wichita Izzies players
Bridgeport Bears (baseball) players
Baseball players from Massachusetts
Boston College alumni
1887 births
1966 deaths